
The history of the City of Perth, a local government area of Western Australia is defined over three distinct periods: 
From 1829 to 1838 — controlled by the Governor of Western Australia
From 1838 to 1858 — controlled by the Perth Town Trust
From 1858 to present — controlled by the Perth City Council, later renamed City of Perth

Origins
On 15 June 1837, an Act was proclaimed to ..provide for the management of roads, streets and other internal communications within the settlement of Western Australia.  The management and control was vested in a body of trustees consisting of the Justices of the Peace resident in the town; and the proprietors of allotments held in fee simple.  The act was repealed in September 1842 and authority was conferred on elected representatives.  The first elected Chairman and committee took office on 8 February 1842 and comprised:
Walter Boyd Andrews (Chairman)
George Leake, James Purkis, Peter Broun, W. H. Drake, Richard Jones (committee members)
James Purkis was appointed treasurer

On 23 February 1856 (two years before the dissolution of the Trust), Perth was constituted a city upon the foundation of the Bishopric of Perth through the consecration of the first Anglican Bishop of Perth, Matthew Blagden Hale.

From 1858 to 1880, the President of the Council was styled "Chairman", from 1880 until 1929, the Chairman was termed the "Mayor" and from 1929 the mayor was elevated to the title of "Lord Mayor".

Chairman, Perth Town Trust (1838–1858)

Chairman, Perth City Council (1858–1879)

Mayor, Perth City Council (1880–1929)

Lord Mayor, Perth City Council (since 1929)

Notes

References

Sources

External links 
 Page at the Perth City website 

Perth
Perth